Launaea resedifolia is a plant species in the family Asteraceae.

Sources

References 

resedifolia
Flora of Malta